Bang is an American brand of energy drinks. It is made by Vital Pharmaceuticals, a corporation located in Florida. As of 2020, Bang is the third highest selling energy drink in the United States, behind Monster and Red Bull. The brand is known for its bold public image; along with sponsoring numerous influencers on social media such as TikTok and Instagram, the company's founder Jack Owoc has also accumulated social media attention through the beverage's popularity.

History 
Bang's parent company, Vital Pharmaceuticals, was founded in 1993 by Jack Owoc. It manufactures and distributes sports supplements and performance beverages under the brand name VPX. Other products distributed by the company include Redline, Noo Fuzion, and Meltdown.

In 2012, the company introduced Bang, marketed as a low sugar carbonated energy drink. Bang Energy's stated mission is to make high-quality nutritional supplements backed by scientific research.

In 2017, Bang Energy announced a caffeine-free variant of the beverage, using beta-alanine in place of caffeine.

In 2019, the company opened a manufacturing and distribution facility in Phoenix, Arizona, which operates alongside their facility in Pembroke Pines, Florida.

In April 2020, PepsiCo entered an exclusive distribution agreement with VPX to distribute Bang in the United States. On November 17, 2020, the company gave PepsiCo a notice of termination; an emergency arbitrator ruled in December 2020 that Pepsi remained the exclusive distributor of Bang drinks until 2023. Bang transitioned from exclusive PepsiCo distribution in June 2022.

In August 2022, it was reported that Keurig Dr Pepper was in talks to purchase VPX; these talks fell apart shortly after the reports surfaced.

On October 10, 2022, Bang's parent company, Vital Pharmaceuticals, filed for Chapter 11 bankruptcy protection. In March 2023, founder and CEO Jack Owoc was removed from the company, with John C. DiDonato named interim CEO.

Products 
The Bang energy drink lineup includes over 40 flavors. Alongside its mainline energy drink, the company also produces several other products marketed under the Bang brand and logo. These include:
 Natural Bang, marketed as an all-natural alternative to mainline Bang.
 Bang Keto Coffee, a high protein coffee drink.
 Bang Shots, similar to that of 5 Hour Energy
 Bang Pre-workout
 Bang Sweet Tea
 Bang ThermIQ, a liquid capsule dietary supplement marketed as a fat burner.
 Bang MIXX Hard Seltzer, an alcoholic drink under the Bang brand. Contains no caffeine.
Vooz Hydration Sensation, marketed as a sports hydration drink

Legal actions and controversy 
Vital Pharmaceuticals was sued by competing energy drink manufacturer Monster Beverage, who alleged that Vital engaged in consumer deception and anti-competitive business practices. Vital countersued, alleging that Monster infringed their copyright by use of similar trade dress.

In a separate lawsuit, Monster Beverage and Orange Bang sued Vital Pharmaceuticals for trademark infringement. Orange Bang previously sued Vital Pharmaceuticals in 2009, and the two companies settled the next year, with restrictions placed on Vital Pharmaceuticals' use of the Bang trademark, limited to "creatine-based" drinks and products sold exclusively at fitness venues such as gyms. The introduction of the "Bang Energy RTD" drink infringed on this settlement, as it contained 'Super Creatine'. The suit found that 'Super Creatine' was not actually creatine, and did not raise the body's creatine levels. The trademark case was ruled in favor of Monster and Orange Bang by an arbitrator, with Vital Pharmaceuticals owing $175 million in damages. Monster later won a false-advertising case regarding Bang's 'Super Creatine' supplement, and was awarded $293 million.

The company was sued by Sony Music in October 2021, claiming that Bang Energy's social media platforms were infringing their copyright by using their music without licensing it.

In August 2022, the estate of musician Prince won a lawsuit against Bang Energy for their usage of the "Purple Rain" trademark.

Vital Pharmaceuticals engaged in legal action with PepsiCo for alleged misconduct and foul play. After terminating their exclusive distribution agreement with PepsiCo, Bang alleged that PepsiCo was misrepresenting itself as the exclusive distributor of their products, and threatened lawsuits against suppliers and distributors who did not purchase Bang products directly from them. An emergency arbitrator ruled in December 2020 that Pepsi remains the exclusive distributor of Bang. Bang and PepsiCo mutually transitioned from their exclusive distribution agreement in June 2022, with then-CEO Jack Owoc claiming that "all disputes with PepsiCo have been fully settled and resolved".

The brand's founder is a supporter of former president Donald Trump, and has donated $250,000 to America First Action, a super PAC endorsed by Trump. Bang has received controversy for its attendance at Turning Point USA conferences, including a stunt in which the brand's marketers fired cash out of a 'money cannon' towards the audience. The company also drew criticism for its response to the COVID-19 pandemic, ordering employees to attend a mandatory in-person meeting, a 'dance party' promoting their Redline Noo-Fusion product, without proper social distancing or security protocols.

References

External links
 

Energy drinks
Companies that filed for Chapter 11 bankruptcy in 2022